Lutz Jäncke (* July 16, 1957 in Wuppertal) is a neuropsychologist and a cognitive neuroscientist.

Life 
Lutz Jäncke studied psychology, neurophysiology and neuroscience at the Ruhr University Bochum, at the Brunswick University of Technology and at the University of Düsseldorf in Düsseldorf. In 1984, he completed his degree in psychology in Düsseldorf. In 1995, he received his PhD (Dr. rer. nat.) from the Mathematics and Natural Sciences faculty of the University of Düsseldorf for his thesis on the importance of audiophonatoric coupling for speech control. In 1995, he habilitated at the same faculty with a paper on "Anatomical and Functional Hemisphere Asymmetry". The habilitation thesis was awarded by the Faculty of Mathematics and Natural Sciences of the University of Düsseldorf.

In 1996, he received a Heisenberg scholarship of the German Research Foundation (Deutsche Forschungsgemeinschaft). After a research internship at Beth Israel Deaconess Medical Center of the Harvard Medical School, he worked as a senior researcher at the Research Centre Jülich (Forschungszentrum Jülich).

In 1997, he accepted an appointment as a C4-professor (full professor) of Psychology of the Otto von Guericke University Magdeburg. Since April 2002 he has been professor of Neuropsychology at the University of Zurich.

Work 
Jäncke's scientific work deals primarily with the functional neuroplasticity of the human brain. He uses imaging methods (functional magnetic resonance imaging, electroencephalography) and brain stimulation methods (transcranial magnetic stimulation, transcranial direct current stimulation). So far, Lutz Jäncke has published more than 400 original papers in scientific journals. His work is listed in the Essential Science Indicator. In addition to the original work, he has published more than 50 book chapters and several books. 

In 2009, he founded "The International Normal Aging and Plasticity Imaging Center – INAPIC" in collaboration with Mike Martin (gerontopsychologist) at the University of Zurich to study the cognitive and neuroscientific foundations of aging. In 2012, Jäncke and Martin founded the university research center "Dynamics of Healthy Aging" at the University of Zurich.

He received the Credit Swiss Teaching Award for best teaching in 2007 from the University of Zurich (renewed in 2010) and the "Goldene Eule" from the ETH Zurich.

Papers 

Google Scholar

Books 
 Methoden der Bildgebung in der Psychologie und den kognitiven Neurowissenschaften. Kohlhammer, Stuttgart 2005.
 with Bärbel Hüsing, Brigitte Tag: Impact Assessment of Neuroimaging. Vdf Hochschulverlag, Zürich 2006.
 hrsg. mit Fred W. Mast: Spatial Processing in Navigation, Imagery and Perception. Springer, New York 2007.
 Macht Musik schlau? Neue Erkenntnisse aus den Neurowissenschaften und der kognitiven Psychologie. Huber, Bern 2008.
 Lehrbuch Kognitive Neurowissenschaften. Huber, Bern 2013.
 Ist unser Hirn vernünftig? Erkenntnisse eines Neuropsychologen. Huber, Bern 2015.

References

External links 
 
 Lutz Jäncke's webpage (Universität Zürich)
 Musik ist Balsam fürs Gehirn – Interview in der Fernsehsendung 

Neuropsychologists
Neurophysiologists
Academic staff of the University of Zurich
German neuroscientists
1957 births
Living people